Aaravos is a fictional character in the American–Canadian fantasy computer-animated web television series The Dragon Prince, which has been aired on Netflix since 2018. The character was created by the show's co-creators Aaron Ehasz and Justin Richmond, and is voiced by Erik Dellums.

Aaravos is introduced as an ancient and mysterious Startouch Elf, a type of elf that connects to the magical energy of the stars and is extremely rare. Trapped in a mysterious realm behind a magic mirror, he comes into contact with Viren, one of the series' main antagonists, and eventually forms a partnership with him in order to ensure his release from the mirror.

Storylines

Background
Aaravos is one of the first elves to exist from Xadia, making him approximately 5000 years old when the series begins. He is the master of all six of the Primal Sources of magic, as well as Dark magic. At one point, he shares undisclosed gifts to humans and saved some Elarion's citizens from Sol Regem's genocide. Despite this, he was present when humanity was banished to the Western side of the continent. 700 years later, Aaravos, for mysterious and unknown reasons, is imprisoned inside a mysterious prison by the alliance of Elven archmages and Archdragons. While being checked through the mirror, Aaravos remained supervised within the magical prison by the late Dragon King Avizandum. The Startouch Elf remains trapped there for the next 300 years until the mirror is stolen by Viren.

Book One: Moon (2018)
Aaravos narrates the prologue of the series premiere, explaining how humanity was banished from Xadia by the elves and dragons. 

Aaravos's hand also appears in the credits of the eighth episode.

Book Two: Sky (2019)
When Viren finally manages to see into the realm behind the magic mirror, a cloaked Aaravos comes into view. Viren realizes the elf cannot see him, but Aaravos eventually casts a spell allowing him to see Viren as well. Because they cannot hear each other, Aaravos gestures to Viren to gather specific items for a magic ritual. Before the last step, however, Viren stops and leaves to think, unsure if he can trust Aaravos. Meanwhile, Callum learns that the cube his father led him to find originally belonged to Aaravos. After Viren's failed attempt to rally the other kingdoms, he follows through with the elf's instructions. The spell teleports from inside the mirror a small purple caterpillar, which crawls to Viren's ear and allows the two to speak. After some convincing, Aaravos finally introduces himself. When Viren tries searching for information on Aaravos in the library, it magically disappears from the scrolls and books. Viren demands to know what's going on and why he should trust the mysterious elf; Aaravos replies that he shouldn't at the moment. When Viren admits that the leaders of the other human kingdoms refuse to listen, Aaravos agrees to help him. First, he has Viren chant a spell to create ghostly versions of elven assassins to terrorize the other monarchs. When castle guards try to arrest him, Aaravos casts spells to help Viren fight them. Upon being surrounded and outnumbered, Aaravos orders Viren to stop and the latter reluctantly obliges. Aaravos promises to stay with Viren, and the caterpillar crawls into his ear.

Book Three: Sun (2019)
In a dungeon, Aaravos encourages a despairing Viren not to give up. When Viren's children visit him, and Claudia demands to know why he ordered Soren to kill Callum and Ezran, Aaravos warns Viren that an honest answer will cost him her loyalty, thus subtlety manipulating him into deceiving her. With two monarchs dead and a third severely injured, the latter's son, Prince Kasef, works with Viren to wage war on Xadia. Aaravos's caterpillar weaves silk over Viren's right eye, allowing him to see an apparition of Aaravos's true form. That evening, Viren declares to his subjects that they will march on Xadia. On the way to Xadia, Aaravos asks how Viren slayed the Dragon King, and Viren tells the tale, delighting the Startouch elf. Aaravos reveals that Avizandum is the one who trapped him in the magic mirror, though he doesn't know where his prison is because the Dragon King never told him. 

As part of the plan to conquer Xadia, Aaravos has Viren enter Lux Aurea, the home of the Sunfire elves. Queen Khessa's attempts to purify Viren of his dark magic give him and Aaravos access to the Sun Forge, the source of their power. Aaravos's caterpillar (now considerably larger) bites the Sunfire High Priest, corrupting not only the latter's Sun staff, but the Sunforge as well. Due to the bite, Aaravos is able to possess the body of the High Priest, and sadistically whispers to Khessa the fate of her grandmother, Queen Aditi, before disintegrating her with a spell. Using the Sun staff, Viren transforms his soldiers into aggressive lava monsters with super strength. As they clash with the elf-human alliance at the base of Storm Spire Mountain, Viren uses the distraction to ascend to the peak, where Aaravos's caterpillar (now the size of a snake) chants a spell to harvest the Dragon Prince's power for Viren. Before the spell can be completed, Rayla tackles Viren and Aaravos over the cliff edge. Callum rescues her, but Viren falls to his death, Aaravos separating from him mid-descent. Claudia finds and revives Viren with dark magic, and subsequently reveals Aaravos's caterpillar has entered a cocoon, metamorphosing into something else.

Book Four: Earth (2022)
In the fourth season, which has renamed the show The Dragon Prince: Mystery of Aaravos, more of Aaravos's plans and history are revealed. Aaravos sets his release in motion using Viren and Claudia as his pawns, with his familiar, now a winged humanoid guiding them to clues that will lead to his prison. After learning of Aaravos's impending return, Zubeia reveals that Aaravos was originally loved and respected by all Xadians, until it was discovered by a human girl that he had orchestrated every major crisis the world had ever faced, including the death of the Dragon Queen Luna Tenebris and the disappearance of Queen Aditi. Working together, the Archdragons and Elven Archmages outwitted Aaravos and trapped him in a secretive magical prison, which Aaravos is not aware of its location. As they returned the mirror and open the window pane, Aaravos makes brief contact with Callum, Ezran, Rayla, and Soren and uses his powers to take control of Callum's body to communicate. He mocks the group, believing they don't stand a chance against him, and uses his magic to destroy the mirror to prevent any further communication.

Development

Characterization and progression
Aaravos is described by the series' creators as a complicated character with a good side and a bad side. He is described as "mysterious and charismatic," as well as "secretive, yet charming." He is also stated by the creators to be manipulative in a "very slow and seductive way", and the fact he is able to manipulate a person as "brilliant" as Viren is a great example of this.

Regarding the character's fascination with humans and the mysterious gifts he shared with them, Ehasz stated that it is partly out of genuine kindness and generosity, and partly out of a desire to be "worshiped" and "revered."

Despite his secretive and manipulative nature, Aaravos has stated that he never tells a lie, which both Ehasz and Richmond have confirmed, stating that he is "manipulative without being deceptive" and "always tells the truth."

Powers and abilities
In the world of The Dragon Prince, only magical creatures can use magic, as they have magical energy within them. All magic originates from one of six Primal Sources: the Sun, the Moon, the Stars, the Earth, the Sky, and the Ocean. As a Startouch Elf, Aaravos is naturally connected to the stars, but due to being a "fallen" member of his race, he can only access a fraction of his former power. He has also somehow mastered the other five Primal Sources, and his abilities related to them are seemingly limitless. Because of this, he is referred to as an "Archmage." An example of Aaravos's mastery is that he is able to perform spells without speaking the required incantations.

Aaravos is also a master of Dark magic, a corrupted form of magic that is fueled by the essence of magical creatures. Aaravos can perform a dark magic spell without speaking an incantation, but at least once says the spell he wishes to perform in reverse. He knows a number of spells which Viren, an expert in the practice himself, does not.

Aaravos has a familiar, a purple caterpillar-like creature that is not native to the world of Xadia. It heavily resembles a real-life Dragonhead caterpillar, which is the larval form of the butterfly Polyura athamas. Starting in the second season, Aaravos uses this caterpillar to communicate with Viren by channeling his voice through it. He can also perform spells through the form and channel them through Viren's staff to help him defeat enemies. The caterpillar evolves with the ongoing story; initially the size of a regular caterpillar, it grows to the size of a snake throughout the third season, and enters metamorphosis in the season finale.

Reception
Aaravos's character and Dellum's performance has been generally praised by critics and fans. Particular attention has been given to Aaravos's interactions and relationship with the human dark mage Viren. The Daily Dots Gavia Baker-Whitelaw called his relationship with Viren "intriguing".

Praise continued into the third season. Hypable praised Aaravos and Viren's relationship and the contrast between the goals and actions of these two characters and those of Callum, Rayla, and Ezran. Nelson also reacted positively to the relationship between the two characters and how Aaravos "preys on Viren's ambition and desperation to fulfill his own mysterious, malevolent goals". Kain also took note of how Aaravos was contributing to Viren's descent into villainy.

References

Fantasy television characters
Fictional characters who use magic
Male characters in animation
Fictional mass murderers
Television characters introduced in 2018
Fictional characters with air or wind abilities
Fictional characters with fire or heat abilities
Fictional characters with electric or magnetic abilities
Fictional revolutionaries
Fictional terrorists
Villains in animated television series